Ar-Ra'd,, or the Thunder, is the 13th chapter (sūrah) of the Qur'an, composed of 43 verses (āyāt). It has Muqattat (Quranic initials)  المر (Alif. Lam. Mim. Ra or ALMR).

Verse 15 contains a prostration symbol ۩:
۝ Whatsoever is in heaven and on earth worshippeth GOD, voluntarily or of force; and their shadows also, morning and evening. ۩ 

This sūrah is concerned with the oneness of God, the message, the Day of judgement, and the penalty. The sūrah revolves around an important axis that what is truth is clear through power and stability;  what is falsehood is clear through its weakness. The verses call upon people to not be deceived by the glitter of falsehood because it is inevitably fleeting, while the truth shines throughout the entire universe. 

The name of the sūrah is from the word (Ar-Ra'd) (Thunder) in the 13th ayat.

Summary
1 The infidels reject the Quran
2-4 God manifests himself to man in his works
5 The unbelievers deny the resurrection
6 Their punishment
7 Threatened judgments sure to come to pass
8 Unbelievers demand a sign
9-12 God is omniscient
12 God's purposes are unchangeable
13-14 Thunder and lightning indicates the unceasing works of angels who regulate the clouds and rains in their task given by God. Ibn Taymiyyah in his work, Majmu al-Fatwa al-Kubra, quoted the Marfu Hadith transmitted by Ali ibn abi Thalib, that Ra'd were the name of group of angels who herded the dark clouds like a shepherd. Ali further narrated that thunder (Ra'dan ) is the growling voices of those angels while herding the clouds, while lightning strikes (Sawa'iq ) are a device used by those angels in gathering and herding the raining clouds. Al-Suyuti narrated from the Hadith transmitted from Ibn Abbas about the lightning angels, while giving further commentary that hot light produced by lightning (Barq ) was the emitted light produced from a whip device used by those angels. Saudi Grand Mufti Abd al-Aziz Bin Baz also ruled the sunnah practice of reciting Sura Ar-Ra'd, Ayah 13| whenever a Muslim hears thunder, as this was practiced according to the Hadith tradition narrated by Zubayr ibn al-Awwam.
۩ 15 Idolaters invoke their gods in vain
16 All nature worships the Creator
17 The separation of infidels from true believers typified in the flowing stream and the melting metal
18-22 True believers described
23-24 Their reward
25 The end of the infidels
26 Abundance of wealth no sign of God's favour
27 The infidels demand a sign from heaven
28 God directs true believers
29 Muhammad sent to an unbelieving people
30 Signs unavailing to make infidels true believers
31-32 God will punish the unbelievers
33-34 Idolaters are reprobate
35 Paradise described
36 Certain Jews acknowledge Muhammad to be a prophet
36-37 Muhammad exhorted to make no compromise with idolatry
38 Wives and children no hindrance to the prophetic office
39 God is lord of his own book
40 Muhammad a preacher only
41 God's judgments sure to come to pass
42 The plots of God's enemies not hidden from him
43 God attests the claims of his Prophet

Time of Revelation 
The rhetoric of the discourse  shows that this sūrah was uncovered in the ending of the Meccan phase, when Muhammad was also revealed with Surahs Yunus, Hud, and Al-A'araf. Time has passed since Muhammad last passed on the Message. His adversaries had been carrying out various plots to vanquish him and his mission, while his supporters thought that by indicating some tangible miracle the disbelievers might be brought to the Correct Path. The sūrah responds that the Devotees ought not to lose heart, and that disbeliever would explain away any miracle, even if Allah brought the dead out of their graves and caused them to talk.

Theme
The opening ayat articulates the fundamental topic of this sūrah: "The Message of Muhammad (Allah's tranquility arrive) is the very Truth, however, it is the shortcoming of the individuals that they are dismissing it". 

Other than this, the sūrah also addresses the rivals and their complaints, and the Devotees, who had been going through trials and were tiring. The Devotees are told that by standing by restlessly for Allah's help, they have been ameliorated and loaded up with expectation and fortitude. The significant issues, divine Laws, and direction incorporated in the text of the discourse can be categorized as follows:-

 The Qur'an is the disclosure of Allah.  
 Trees, fruits, and vegetables are among the indications of Allah.  
 Allah never changes the state of a people except if they are eager to change themselves.  
 The individuals who don't react to the call of Allah will have no real way to escape from hellfire.
 It is the recognition of Allah that gives quietness to hearts.  
 Rasools [Prophets] have no capacity to show any marvel of miracle with the exception of the will of Allah.

References

External links
Quran 13 Clear Quran translation

Ra'd